Peggy Chiao is a Taiwanese/Chinese filmmaker, producer, distributor, educator, juror, critic, and author. She is known internationally as the "godmother of New Taiwan Cinema".

In 1997, Chiao established Arc Light Films, a production company with pan-Chinese ambition which has produced films with directors like Ann Hui, Stanley Kwan, Wang Xiaoshuai, Olivier Assayas, Yi Chih-yen, Kenny Bi, etc.

Since then, Chiao has produced critically and commercially successful films encompassing many genres and themes. Her award-winning films include Beijing Bicycle (2001), The Hole (1998), Blue Gate Crossing (2002), Drifters (2003), Green Hat (2004), Betelnut Beauty (2001), HHH: Portrait of Hous-Hsiao-Hsien (2012), Lost in Beijing (2007), Buddha Mountain (2010) and The Drummer (2007), among many others. Aside from the acclaimed films, she also helped initiate the romantic comedy genre in Taiwan and China with films such as Hear Me (2009), Blue Gate Crossing (2002), Love Speaks (2013), and The Stolen Years (2013). She produced period dramas such as Empire of Silver (2009) and Lord of Shanghai (2016), and also documentaries such as Homesick Eyes (1997) and Datong: The Great Society (2011).

Recently, she began exploring web platforms with series like Finding Soul (2016), with cult-following boy band TFboys.

A tireless advocate of the new talents in Taiwan, Hong Kong, and mainland China, she is one of the main reasons that Hou Hsiao-hsien, Edward Yang, Ang Lee, Wang Xiaoshuai, Tsai Ming Liang, and many other directors have been introduced to the western world. During the 1980s and 1990s, Chiao has been credited for introducing the world to New Taiwan Cinema, helping to define the diverse aesthetics as well as cultural and historical themes in the movement.

In 2007, she was elected as chair of the Golden Horse Film Festival, for which she reformed the jury system, brought in FIPRESCI and NETPAC and established co-production meetings; helping shape Golden Horse into the world-renowned film festival as it is today. Earlier in 1990, Chiao founded the China Times Express Award, which evolved into the Taipei International Film Award.

She has served as juror for many international film festivals including San Francisco, Seattle, Vancouver, Berlin, Brisbane, Sydney, Rome, Venice, San Sebastián, São Paulo, Buenos Aires, Mannheim-Heidelberg, Oberhausen, Tokyo, Fukuoka, Jeonju, Singapore, Hong Kong, Bangkok, New Delhi, Tashkent and many Chinese film festivals.

Academically, Chiao was the director of the Graduate School of Filmmaking at the Taipei National University of the Arts and have been a professor there since 1985. She has taught in different universities in Taipei, Shanghai, Nanchang and Beijing.

Over her decades-spanning career, she has published over 80 books. Some of them have even been assigned as textbooks in major film schools across Chinese-language territories.

Career 
Chiao received her MA at the University of Texas at Austin and was in the Ph.D. program at the University of California, Los Angeles.

As a film critic and author, Chiao has written for major Taiwanese newspapers. She keeps regular columns in China for film magazines and newspapers. Many of her essays have been translated and included in various anthologies. Some of her notable books include New Taiwan Cinema (1987), Hong Kong New Wave (1987) and Aspects of New Asian Films (1991), The auteurs of Taiwan and Hong Kong Films (1995), French New Wave (2004), Musicals (1993), Films of Akira Kurosawa (2018), Latino Cinema (part I&II, 2021), etc.

Chiao was the CEO of National Taiwan Film Year consigned by the Taiwan government in 1993, for which she programmed 16 retrospectives of Taiwan films abroad and various projects to consolidate film industry and culture. This includes producing 6 shorts with youngsters who later became famous directors such as Chen Yu-hsun, Hsiao Ya-chuan, and Lin Cheng-sheng. The following year, Chiao founded the Taiwan Film Center to help develop an international network for local Taiwanese filmmakers, organizing Taiwan Retrospectives at Pesaro, Toronto, New York's Lincoln Center, Chicago's Art Center, etc.

Filmography

Bibliography

Translated Works

References

External links 
 Peggy Chiao's Blog
 

Taiwanese film producers
Living people
Year of birth missing (living people)